The Palacio de la Bahia Hotel & Tower was a  tall supertall skyscraper planned for construction at Ave. Balboa, Ave. México, 29 Este y 30 Este, The Exposition in Panama City, Panama.

Construction was to have begun on 28 July 2006, for completion in 2009.

See also
List of tallest buildings in Panama City

References

Unbuilt buildings and structures in Panama